Macau is a special administrative region (SAR) of the People's Republic of China. It was leased to Portugal in 1557 as a trading post in exchange for a symbolic annual rent of 500 tael. Despite remaining under Chinese sovereignty and authority, the Portuguese came to consider and administer Macau as a de facto colony. Following the signing of the Treaty of Nanking between China and Britain in 1842, and the signing of treaties between China and foreign powers during the 1860s, establishing the benefit of "the most favoured nation" for them, the Portuguese attempted to conclude a similar treaty in 1862, but the Chinese refused, owing to a misunderstanding over the sovereignty of Macau. In 1887 the Portuguese finally managed to secure an agreement from China that Macau was Portuguese territory. In 1999 it was handed over to China. Macau was the last extant European territory in continental Asia.

Early history

The human history of Macau stretches back up to 6,000 years, and includes many different and diverse civilisations and periods of existence. Evidence of human and culture dating back 3,500 to 4,000 years has been discovered on the Macau Peninsula on Coloane Island.

During the Qin dynasty (221–206 BC), the region was under the jurisdiction of Panyu County, Nanhai Prefecture of the province of Guangdong. The region is first known to have been settled during the Han dynasty. It was administratively part of Dongguan Prefecture in the Jin dynasty (266–420 AD), and alternated under the control of Nanhai and Dongguan in later dynasties.

Since the 5th century, merchant ships travelling between Southeast Asia and Guangzhou used the region as a port for refuge, fresh water, and food. In 1152, during the Song dynasty (960–1279 AD), it was under the jurisdiction of the new Xiangshan County. In 1277, approximately 50,000 refugees fleeing the Mongol conquest of China settled in the coastal area.

Mong Há has long been the centre of Chinese life in Macau and the site of what may be the region's oldest temple, a shrine devoted to the Buddhist Guanyin (Goddess of Mercy). Later in the Ming dynasty (1368–1644 AD), fishermen migrated to Macau from various parts of Guangdong and Fujian provinces and built the A-Ma Temple where they prayed for safety on the sea. The Hoklo Boat people were the first to show interest in Macau as a trading centre for the southern provinces. However, Macau did not develop as a major settlement until the Portuguese arrived in the 16th century.

Portuguese settlement

During the age of discovery Portuguese sailors explored the coasts of Africa and Asia. The sailors later established posts at Goa in 1510, and  conquered Malacca in 1511, driving the Sultan to the southern tip of the Malay Peninsula from where he kept making raids on the Portuguese. The Portuguese under Jorge Álvares landed at Lintin Island in the Pearl River Delta of China in 1513 with a hired junk sailing from Portuguese Malacca. They erected a stone marker at Lintin Island claiming it for the King of Portugal, Manuel I. In the same year, the Indian Viceroy Afonso de Albuquerque commissioned Rafael Perestrello — a cousin of Christopher Columbus – to sail to China in order to open up trade relations. Rafael traded with the Chinese merchants in Guangzhou in that year and in 1516, but was not allowed to move further.

Portugal's king Manuel I in 1517 commissioned a diplomatic and trade mission to Guangzhou headed by Tomé Pires and Fernão Pires de Andrade. The embassy lasted until the death of the Zhengde Emperor in Nanjing. The embassy was further rejected by the Chinese Ming court, which now became less interested in new foreign contacts. The Ming Court was also influenced by reports of misbehaviour of Portuguese elsewhere in China, and by the deposed Sultan of Malacca seeking Chinese assistance to drive the Portuguese out of Malacca.

In 1521 and 1522 several more Portuguese ships reached the trading island Tamão off the coast near Guangzhou, but were driven away by the now-hostile Ming authorities. Pires was imprisoned and died in Canton.

In their first attempts at obtaining trading posts by force, the Portuguese were defeated by the Ming Chinese at the Battle of Tunmen in Tamão or Tuen Mun in 1521 where the Portuguese lost two ships, and Battle of Sincouwaan in Lantau Island where the Portuguese also lost two ships, and Shuangyu in 1548 where several Portuguese were captured and near the Dongshan Peninsula in 1549, where two Portuguese junks and Galeote Pereira were captured. During these battles the Ming Chinese captured weapons from the defeated Portuguese which they then reverse engineered and mass-produced in China such as matchlock musket arquebuses which they named bird guns and Breech loading swivel guns which they named as Folangji (Frankish) cannon because the Portuguese were known to the Chinese under the name of Franks at this time. The Portuguese later returned to China peacefully and presented themselves under the name Portuguese instead of Franks in the Luso-Chinese agreement (1554) and rented Macau as a trading post from China by paying annual lease of hundreds of silver taels to Ming China.

Good relations between the Portuguese and Chinese Ming dynasty resumed in the 1540s, when Portuguese aided China in eliminating coastal pirates. The two later began annual trade missions to the offshore Shangchuan Island in 1549. A few years later, Lampacau Island, closer to the Pearl River Delta, became the main base of the Portuguese trade in the region.

Diplomatic relations were further improved and salvaged by the Leonel de Sousa agreement with Cantonese authorities in 1554. In 1557, the Ming court finally gave consent for a permanent and official Portuguese trade base at Macau. In 1558, Leonel de Sousa became the second Portuguese governor of Macau.

They later built some rudimentary stone-houses around the area now called Nam Van.  But not until 1557 did the Portuguese establish a permanent settlement in Macau, at an annual rent of 500 taels (~) of silver. Later that year, the Portuguese established a walled village there. Ground rent payments began in 1573. China retained sovereignty and Chinese residents were subject to Chinese law, but the territory was under Portuguese administration. In 1582 a land lease was signed, and annual rent was paid to Xiangshan County. The Portuguese continued to pay an annual tribute up to 1863 in order to stay in Macau.

The Portuguese often married Tanka women since Han Chinese women would not have relations with them. Some of the Tanka's descendants became Macanese people. Some Tanka children were enslaved by Portuguese raiders. The Chinese poet Wu Li wrote a poem, which included a line about the Portuguese in Macau being supplied with fish by the Tanka.

Macau's golden age

After the Portuguese were allowed to permanently settle in Macau, both Chinese and Portuguese merchants flocked to Macau, although the Portuguese were never numerous (numbering just 900 in 1583 and 1200 out of 26,000 in 1640). It quickly became an important node in the development of Portugal's trade along three major routes: Macau–Malacca–Goa–Lisbon, Guangzhou–Macau–Nagasaki and Macau–Manila–Mexico. The Guangzhou–Macau–Nagasaki route was particularly profitable because the Portuguese acted as middlemen, shipping Chinese silks to Japan and Japanese silver to China, pocketing huge markups in the process. This already lucrative trade became even more so when Chinese officials handed Macau's Portuguese traders a monopoly by banning direct trade with Japan in 1547, due to piracy by Chinese and Japanese nationals.

Macau's golden age coincided with the union of the Spanish and Portuguese crowns, between 1580 and 1640. King Philip II of Spain was encouraged to not harm the status quo, to allow trade to continue between Portuguese Macau and Spanish Manila, and to not interfere with Portuguese trade with China. In 1587, Philip promoted Macau from "Settlement or Port of the Name of God" to "City of the Name of God" (Cidade do Nome de Deus de Macau).

The alliance of Portugal with Spain meant that Portuguese colonies became targets for the Netherlands, which was embroiled at the time in a lengthy struggle for its independence from Spain, the Eighty Years' War. After the Dutch East India Company was founded in 1602, the Dutch unsuccessfully attacked Macau several times, culminating in a full-scale invasion attempt in 1622, when 800 attackers were successfully repelled by 150 Macanese and Portuguese defenders and a large number of African slaves. One of the first actions of Macau's next governor, who arrived the following year, was to strengthen the city's defences, which included the construction of the Guia Fortress.

Religious activity
As well as being an important trading post, Macau was a centre of activity for Catholic missionaries, as it was seen as a gateway for the conversion of the vast populations of China and Japan.  Jesuits had first arrived in the 1560s and were followed by Dominicans in the 1580s. Both orders soon set about constructing churches and schools, the most notable of which were the Jesuit Cathedral of Saint Paul and the St. Dominic's Church built by the Dominicans. In 1576, Macau was established as an episcopal see by Pope Gregory XIII with Melchior Carneiro appointed as the first bishop.

1637–1844: Decline

In 1637, increasing suspicion of the intentions of Spanish and Portuguese Catholic missionaries in Japan finally led the shōgun to seal Japan off from foreign influence. Later named the sakoku period, this meant that no Japanese were allowed to leave the country (or return if they were living abroad), and no foreign ship was allowed to dock in a Japanese port. An exception was made for the Protestant Dutch, who were allowed to continue to trade with Japan from the confines of a small man-made island in Nagasaki, Deshima. Macau's most profitable trade route, that between Japan and China, had been severed. The crisis was compounded two years later by the loss of Malacca to the Dutch in 1641, damaging the link with Goa.

The news that the Portuguese House of Braganza had regained control of the Crown from the Spanish Habsburgs took two years to reach Macau, arriving in 1642. A ten-week celebration ensued, and despite its new-found poverty, Macau sent gifts to the new King João IV along with expressions of loyalty. In return, the King rewarded Macau with the addition of the words "There is none more Loyal" to its existing title. Macau was now "City of the Name of God, Macau, There is none more loyal".  ("Cidade do Nome de Deus, Macau, Nao Ha Outra Mais Leal" []).

In 1685, the privileged position of the Portuguese in trade with China ended, following a decision by the Kangxi Emperor of China to allow trade with all foreign countries. Over the next century, Britain, the Dutch Republic, France, Denmark, Sweden, the United States and Russia moved in, establishing factories and offices in Guangzhou and Macau. British trading dominance in the 1790s was unsuccessfully challenged by a combined French and Spanish naval squadron at the Macau Incident of 27 January 1799.

Until 20 April 1844 Macau was under the jurisdiction of Portugal's Indian colonies, the so-called "Estado português da India" (Portuguese State of India), but after this date, it, along with East Timor, was accorded recognition by Lisbon (but not by Beijing) as an overseas province of Portugal. The Treaty of Peace, Amity, and Commerce between China and the United States was signed in a temple in Macau on 3 July 1844. The temple was used by a Chinese judicial administrator, who also oversaw matters concerning foreigners, and was located in the village of Mong Há. The Templo de Kun Iam was the site where, on 3 July 1844, the treaty of Wangxia (named after the village of Mong Ha where the temple was located) was signed by representatives of the United States and China. This marked the official beginning of Sino-US relations.

1844–1938: The Hong Kong effect

After China ceded Hong Kong to the British in 1842, Macau's position as a major regional trading centre declined further still because larger ships were drawn to the deep-water port of Victoria Harbour. In an attempt to reverse the decline, Portugal declared Macau a free port, expelled Chinese officials and soldiers, and thereafter levied taxes on Chinese residents. In 1846, there was a revolt of the boatmen that was put down.

Portugal continued to pay rent to China until 1849, when the Portuguese abolished the Chinese customs house and declared Macau's "independence", a year which also saw Chinese retaliation and finally the assassination of Gov. Ferreira do Amaral during the so-called Baishaling incident. Portugal gained control of the island of Wanzai (Lapa by the Portuguese and now as Wanzaizhen), to the northwest of Macau and which now is under the jurisdiction of Zhuhai (Xiangzhou District), in 1849 but relinquished it in 1887. Control over Taipa and Coloane, two islands south of Macau, was obtained between 1851 and 1864. Macau and East Timor were again combined as an overseas province of Portugal under control of Goa in 1883. The Protocol Respecting the Relations Between the Two Countries (signed in Lisbon 26 March 1887) and the Beijing Treaty (signed in Beijing on 1 December 1887) confirmed "perpetual occupation and government" of Macau by Portugal (with Portugal's promise "never to alienate Macau and dependencies without agreement with China" in the treaty). Taipa and Coloane were also ceded to Portugal, but the border with the mainland was not delimited. Ilha Verde was incorporated into Macau's territory in 1890, and, once a kilometre offshore, by 1923 it had been absorbed into peninsula Macau through land reclamation.

In 1871, the Hospital Kiang Wu was founded as a traditional Chinese medical hospital. It was in 1892 that doctor Sun Yat-sen brought Western medicine services to the hospital.

In the 1930s, Macau's traditional income streams related to illegal opium sales dried up, as the Royal Navy's Eastern Fleet suppressed piracy and smuggling in support of Hong Kong's growing commercial status. Traditional local industries of fishing, firecrackers and incense, as well as tea and tobacco processing, were all small scale, while Macau government income from 'Fan-Tan' gambling was only around US$5000 (about US$100,000 in modern money) per day. So the financially pressed Portuguese government urged the colony's administrators to develop greater economic self-sufficiency. One channel that bore fruit was as a transit point for the new trans-Pacific passenger and postal flights, for competing airlines from the US and Japan – which was at the time engaged in conflict with China. In 1935, Pan-Am secured sea-landing rights in Macau and immediately set about building related communications infrastructure in the enclave, allowing a service from San Francisco to begin in November that year.

Intertwined with this economic progress was an alleged and much discussed offer (never officially confirmed) in 1935 by Japan to buy Macau from Portugal, for US$100 million. Concerns were raised by the British, and others. In May, the Portuguese government twice denied that it would accept any such offer, and the matter was closed.

1848–1870s: Slave trade

From 1848 to about the early 1870s, Macau was the infamous transit port of a trade of coolies (or slave labourers) from southern China. Most of them were kidnapped from the Guangdong province and were shipped off in packed vessels to Cuba, Peru, or other South American ports to work on plantations or in mines. Many died on the way there due to malnutrition, disease, or other mistreatment. The Dea del Mar which had set sail to Callao from Macau in 1865 with 550 Chinese on board, arrived in Tahiti with only 162 of them still alive.

1938–1949: World War II 

Macau became a refugee centre during World War II, causing its population to climb from about 200,000 to about 700,000 people within a few years. Refugee operations were organised through the Santa Casa da Misericordia.

Unlike in the case of Portuguese Timor, which was occupied by the Japanese in 1942 along with Dutch Timor, the Japanese respected Portuguese neutrality in Macau, but only up to a point. As such, Macau enjoyed a brief period of economic prosperity, being the only neutral port in South China, after the Japanese had occupied Guangzhou (Canton) and Hong Kong. In August 1943, Japanese troops seized the British steamer Sian in Macau and killed about 20 guards. The next month, they demanded the installation of Japanese "advisors" under the alternative of military occupation. The result was that a virtual Japanese protectorate was created over Macau.

When it was discovered that neutral Macau was planning to sell aviation fuel to Japan, aircraft from the USS Enterprise bombed and strafed the hangar of the Naval Aviation Centre on 16 January 1945 to destroy the fuel. American air raids on targets in Macau were also made on 25 February and 11 June 1945. Following Portuguese government protest in 1950, the United States paid US$20,255,952 compensation to the government of Portugal.

1949–1999: Macau and communist China 

When the Chinese communists came to power in 1949, they declared the Protocol of Lisbon to be invalid as an "unequal treaty" imposed by foreigners on China. However, Beijing was not ready to settle the treaty question, leaving the maintenance of "the status quo" until a more appropriate time. Beijing took a similar position on treaties relating to the Hong Kong territories of the United Kingdom.

In 1951, the Salazar regime declared Macau, as well as other Portuguese colonies, an "Overseas Province" of Portugal.

During the 1950s and 1960s Macau's border crossing to China Portas do Cerco was also referred to as Far Eastern Checkpoint Charlie with a major border incident happening in 1952 with Portuguese African Troops exchanging fire with Chinese Communist border guards. According to reports, the exchange lasted for one-and-three-quarter hours, leaving one dead and several dozens injured on the Macau side and more than 100 casualties claimed on the Communist Chinese side.

In 1954, the Macau Grand Prix was established, first as a treasure hunt throughout the city, and in later years as a formal car racing event.

In 1962, the gambling industry of Macau saw a major breakthrough when the government granted the Sociedade de Turismo e Diversões de Macau (STDM), a syndicate jointly formed by Hong Kong and Macau businessmen, the monopoly rights to all forms of gambling. The STDM introduced western-style games and modernised the marine transport between Macau and Hong Kong, bringing millions of gamblers from Hong Kong every year.

Riots broke out in 1966 during the communist Cultural Revolution, when local Chinese and the Macau authority clashed, the most serious one being the so-called 12-3 incident. This was sparked by the overreaction of some Portuguese officials to what was a regular minor dispute concerning building permits. The riots caused eight deaths and the end was a total climbdown by the Portuguese government.

On 29 January 1967, the Portuguese governor, José Manuel de Sousa e Faro Nobre de Carvalho, with the endorsement of Portuguese prime minister Salazar, signed a statement of apology at the Chinese Chamber of Commerce, under a portrait of Mao Zedong, with Ho Yin, the chamber's president, presiding.

Two agreements were signed, one with Macau's Chinese community, and the other with mainland China. The latter committed the government to compensate local Chinese community leaders with as much as 2 million Macau patacas and to prohibit all Kuomintang activities in Macau. This move ended the conflict, and relations between the government and the leftist organisations remained largely peaceful.

This success in Macau encouraged leftists in Hong Kong to "do the same", leading to riots by leftists in Hong Kong in 1967.

A Portuguese proposal to return the province to China was declined by China.

Also in 1966, the Church of our Lady of Sorrows on Coloane opened up.

In 1968, the Taipa-Coloane Causeway linking Taipa island and Coloane island was opened up.

In 1974, following the anti-colonialist Carnation Revolution, Portugal relinquished all claims over Macau and proposed to return Macau back to Chinese sovereignty.

In 1990, the Academy of Public Security Forces was founded in Coloane.

In 1994, the Bridge of Friendship was completed, the second bridge connecting Macau and Taipa.

In November 1995, the Macau International Airport was inaugurated. Before then the territory only had 2 temporary airports for small aeroplanes, in addition to several permanent heliports.

In 1997, the Macau Stadium was completed in Taipa.

1999: Handover to the People's Republic of China

Portugal and the People's Republic of China established diplomatic relations on 8 February 1979, and Beijing acknowledged Macau as "Chinese territory under Portuguese administration."  A year later, Gen. Melo Egidio became the first governor of Macau to pay an official visit to Beijing.

The visit underscored both parties' interest in finding a mutually agreeable solution to Macau's status. A joint communique signed 20 May 1986 called for negotiations on the Macau question, and four rounds of talks followed between 30 June 1986 and 26 March 1987. The Joint Declaration on the Question of Macau was signed in Beijing on 13 April 1987, setting the stage for the return of Macau to full Chinese sovereignty as a Special Administrative Region on 20 December 1999.

After four rounds of talks, "the Joint Declaration of the Government of the People's Republic of China and the Government of the Republic of Portugal on the Question of Macau" was officially signed in April 1987. The two sides exchanged instruments of ratification on 15 January 1988 and the Joint Declaration entered into force. During the transitional period, between the date of the entry into force of the Joint Declaration and 19 December 1999, the Portuguese government was responsible for the administration of Macau.

The Basic Law of the Macau Special Administrative Region of the People's Republic of China, was adopted by the National People's Congress (NPC) on 31 March 1993 as the constitutional law for Macau, taking effect on 20 December 1999.

The PRC has promised that, under its "one country, two systems" formula, China's socialist economic system will not be practised in Macau and that Macau will enjoy a high degree of autonomy in all matters except foreign and defence affairs until, at least, 2049, fifty years after the handover.

Although offered control of Macau as early as the 1960s, the Chinese deemed the time "not yet ripe" and preferred to wait until December 1999 – the very end of the millennium, two years after the Hong Kong handover—to close this chapter of history.

Upon the handover of Macau European colonisation of Asia ended.

Recent history of Macau (1999–present)

1999–2007: The rise of Macau as the Las Vegas of Asia

In 2002, the Macau government ended the gambling monopoly system and 3 (later 6) casino operating concessions (and subconcessions) were granted to Sociedade de Jogos de Macau (SJM, an 80% owned subsidiary of STDM), Wynn Resorts, Las Vegas Sands, Galaxy Entertainment Group, the partnership of MGM Mirage and Pansy Ho Chiu-king, and the partnership of Melco and PBL, thus marking the begin of the rise of Macau as the new gambling hub in Asia.

As one of the measures to develop the gambling industry, the Cotai reclamation was completed after the handover to China, with construction of the hotel and casino industry starting in 2004. In 2007, the first of many resorts opened, The Venetian Macao. Many other resorts followed, both in Cotai and on Macau island, providing for a major tax income stream to Macau government and a drop in overall unemployment over the years down to a mere 2% in 2013.

In 2004, the Sai Van Bridge was completed, the third bridge between Macau island and Taipa island.

In 2005, the Macau East Asian Games Dome, the principal venue for the 4th East Asian Games, was inaugurated.

Also in 2005, the Macau government started a wave of social housing construction (lasting until 2013 at least), constructing over 8000 apartment units in the process.

2007–2008: The Financial Crisis hits Macau

Similar to other economies in the world, the financial crisis of 2007–08 hit Macau, leading to a stall in construction of major construction works (Sands Cotai Central) and a spike in unemployment.

2008–2013: Expansion into Hengqin and further Casino boom

With residential and development space being sparse, Macau government officially announced on 27 June 2009 that the University of Macau will build its new campus on Hengqin island, in a stretch directly facing the Cotai area, south of the current border post. Along with this development, several other residential and business development projects on Hengqin are in the planning.

In 2011 to 2013, further major construction on several planned mega-resorts in Cotai commenced.

2014–present: Slowing down of the gambling industry and diversification of economy

2014 marked the first time that the gambling revenues in Macau declined on a year-to-year basis. Starting in June 2014, gambling revenues declined for the second half of the year on a month-to-month basis (compared with 2013) causing the Macau Daily Times to announce that the "Decade of gambling expansion end[ed]". Some reasons for the slowdown are China's anti-corruption drive reaching Macau, China's economy slowing down and changes of Mainland Chinese tourists' preference of visiting other countries as a travel destination.

This led the Macau government to attempt to reconstruct the economy, to depend less on gambling revenues and focus on building world-class non-gambling tourism and leisure centres, as well as developing itself as a platform for economic and trade cooperation between China and Portuguese-speaking countries.

In 2015, the borders of Macau were redrawn by the state council, shifting the land border north to the Canal dos Patos and expanding the maritime border significantly. The changes increased the size of Macau's maritime territory by 85 square kilometres.

Typhoon Hato hit Southern China in August 2017, causing widespread damage to Macau, never before experienced – major flooding and property damages, with citywide power and water outages lasting for at least 24 hours after the passage of the storm. Overall, 10 deaths and at least 200 injuries were reported. This caused widespread anger against the Macau government, accused of being unprepared for the typhoon as well as the delay of raising the No. 10 tropical cyclone signal; this caused the head of the Macao Meteorological and Geophysical Bureau to resign. At the request of the Macau government, the Chinese People's Liberation Army Macau Garrison (for the first time in Macau's history) deployed around 1,000 troops to assist in disaster relief and cleaning up.

On 12 December 2019, Macau officially opened its first rail transit system: the Macau Light Rapid Transit.

See also
 Anders Ljungstedt
 Culture of Macau
 Gambling in Macau
 Lisbon-Macau Raid
 Military of Macau under Portuguese rule
 Jorge Álvares
 Names of Macau
 Religion in Macau
 History of Hong Kong

References

Further reading
 Collis, Maurice. "Macao: The City of the Name of God." History Today (Apr 1951) 1#4 pp 42–49 online. 
 Gunn, Geoffrey C. Encountering Macau, A Portuguese City-State on the Periphery of China, 1557–1999 (Boulder: Westview Press, 1996)  In Portuguese (1998) Ao Encontro de Macau: Uma cidade-estado portuguesa a periferia da China, 1557–1999 (Macau:  Fundação Macau].  In Chinese (2009) 澳门史：1557～1999 (中央编译出版社).
 Gunn, Geoffrey C. (ed.) Wartime Macau: Under the Japanese Shadow (Hong Kong: Hong Kong University Press, 2016). 
Porter, Jonathan. "'The Past Is Present': The Construction of Macau's Historical Legacy," History and Memory Volume 21, Number 1, Spring/Summer 2009 pp. 63–100
Porter, Jonathan.  Macau: The Imaginary City, Culture and Society, 1557 to the Present (Boulder: Westview Press, 1996)
 
 Souza, George Bryan. The Survival of Empire: Portuguese Trade and Society in China and the South China Sea, 1630–1754 (Cambridge: Cambridge University Press, 1986)
 Coates, Austin: A Macao Narrative
 Shipp, Steve: Macau, China: A Political History of the Portuguese Colony's Transition to Chinese Rule

External links
Macau handover: Asia's last colony
http://multimedia.scmp.com/macau/
How Did Portugal Get Macau?

 
European colonisation in Asia